The 1996 British Open was a professional ranking snooker tournament which was held from 1–8 April 1996 at the Plymouth Pavilions, Plymouth, England.
 
Nigel Bond won the tournament, his first ranking title, by defeating the defending champion John Higgins 9–8 in the final.

Main draw

Final

References

British Open (snooker)
British Open
Open (snooker)
British Open